Barzan was a historical palace in Ha'il, Saudi Arabia. Its construction was begun in 1808 by Prince Muhammad bin Abdul Muhsin Al Ali. The palace was completed during the rule of the second Rashidi amir, Talal bin Abdullah.

Barzan Palace consisted of three floors and covered an area of more than 300,000 square meters. The first floor featured the reception halls, gardens, and kitchens. The second floor housed diplomatic guests, and the third floor was occupied by the royal family. It was located near Barzan souq.

Ibn Saud of Saudi Arabia ordered the palace destroyed after he had ousted the last Al Rashid emir from power in 1921.

References

Demolished buildings and structures in Saudi Arabia
Houses completed in the 19th century
Palaces in Saudi Arabia